Vladimir Šeks (born 1 January 1943) is a Croatian lawyer and politician. He has been a representative in the Croatian Parliament since the nation's independence, and has held the posts of the Speaker of the Parliament, as well as Deputy Prime Minister in the government. He also served as acting President of the Croatian Democratic Union and Leader of the Opposition from 5 January to 30 April 2000. 

He graduated from the Zagreb Faculty of Law in 1966. 

From 1972 to 1981, he worked as a lawyer until his arrest for "anti-state actions" against communist Yugoslavia. He served 13 months in the prison at Stara Gradiška. Later, he was an attorney for dissidents, including the "Belgrade Six" (1984–85).

In 1990, Šeks was one of the founders of the Osijek branch of the Croatian Democratic Union. In 1991, he was one of the main drafters of the Constitution of Croatia. In 1992, he was named the State Prosecutor of the Republic of Croatia. He was a deputy of the president of the government of Croatia under Hrvoje Šarinić and Nikica Valentić from 1992 to 1995. Šeks served as Speaker of the Croatian Parliament from 22 December 2003 until 11 January 2008.

His 25-year-old son Domagoj was found dead in Goa, India on 26 February 2005 after he was reported missing by friends a day earlier. The exact circumstances of his death were never determined.

In 2009, he testified in the Branimir Glavaš trial as a witness for the defence, and his testimony was later dismissed by the presiding judge as "completely implausible", and the court rendered a guilty verdict.

In 2010, Amnesty International issued a statement that Šeks should be prosecuted based upon testimony from the Glavaš trial.

In January 2011 the Ministry of Justice responded to the AI report saying their conclusions were "arbitrary and wrong" in the case of Šeks.

In 1997, Šeks declined to prosecute Miro Bajramović (a former police officer), Nebojša Hodak, Munib Suljić, and Igor Mikola, four members of the "Autumn Rains" unit of Tomislav Merčep during the Yugoslav wars. The men began running an elaborate detention center in Poljana Pakračka, southeast of Zagreb, where prisoners were tortured with electric shocks or doused with gasoline and burned alive. Bajramović said nearly all the prisoners were executed and buried in mass graves. Some of the men, including Bajramović, were later indicted and tried by local courts, but not the ICTY. Bajramović, who stated that his unit had killed  280 people in Poljana Pakračka and between 90 and 110 in Gospić, received a sentence of 12 years in prison.

Honours
Grand Order of King Petar Krešimir IV (2008) – 3rd-highest Croatian state award and the 16th of its kind awarded since its establishment.

References

External links

1943 births
Living people
People from Osijek
Speakers of the Croatian Parliament
Representatives in the modern Croatian Parliament
Croatian Democratic Union politicians
Government ministers of Croatia
Order of Ante Starčević recipients